Sparkle Night is an EP by Dutch band Seirom, released on April 22, 2013 by Sulphurous Productions.

Track listing

Personnel
Adapted from the Goodbye Cold Nights liner notes.
 Maurice de Jong (as Mories) – vocals, instruments, recording, cover art

Release history

References

External links 
 Sparkle Night at Discogs (list of releases)
 Sparkle Night at Bandcamp

2013 EPs
Seirom albums